Wayne Barnes (born 20 April 1979) is an English international rugby union referee and barrister. He is a regular referee in the English Premiership, and has refereed games in the Heineken Cup and the European Challenge Cup. At international level, Barnes has refereed matches at the Rugby World Cup, the Six Nations, the Rugby Championship and the Pacific Nations Cup competitions.

Early life
Born in Bream, in the Forest of Dean, Gloucestershire, he was educated at Whitecross School; and at the University of East Anglia.

Refereeing career
Barnes started playing rugby at the age of eight, and took up refereeing aged 15 with Gloucester & District Referees. At university he transferred to the Norfolk Referees Society, part of Eastern Counties (ECRURF) followed by a transfer to London Society of RFU Referees. In 2001, at the age of 21, Barnes became the youngest referee ever appointed to the Panel of National Referees. He became a professional referee in April 2005.

Barnes refereed at the 2003 U19 World Cup in Saint-Denis, the 2005 Under 21 Rugby World Championship in Argentina, and was the English representative on the Sevens circuit from December 2003 to March 2005. In 2006, Barnes made his Test debut as a referee, taking charge of three matches in the inaugural Pacific Five Nations.

Barnes was one of three English referees to officiate at the 2007 Rugby World Cup, the others being Chris White and Tony Spreadbury. After New Zealand were knocked out of the quarter-final, Bebo profiles were created by some New Zealand fans dedicated to criticism, and abuse, of Barnes. Comments on Bebo and other internet sites, including death threats and personal abuse, were condemned by the International Rugby Board and New Zealand Prime Minister Helen Clark.  He was, however, later chosen to referee France vs All Blacks in Paris during their end of year tour.

In the 2008 Six Nations Championship, Barnes became the first English official ever to take charge of a match at Croke Park, in which Wales beat Ireland 16–12. In the 2009 Six Nations Championship, Barnes refereed the final-day decider between Wales and Ireland at the Millennium Stadium, Cardiff where Ireland were chasing their first Grand Slam for 61 years and Wales chasing the Championship.

He was appointed in 2008 to take charge of his first Heineken Cup knockout match, between Stade Toulousain and Cardiff Blues at Le Stadium on 6 April 2008. In 2010, Barnes officiated his first Heineken Cup Final between Toulouse and Biarritz at the Stade de France, Saint-Denis, on 22 May.

After officiating at his second Rugby World Cup (in New Zealand) in 2011 and presiding over the third/fourth place play off game between Wales and Australia, Barnes refereed the Heineken Cup semi-final match on Sunday 29 April 2012; Clermont Auvergne v Leinster.

Barnes was one of the officials present at the Pacific Nations' Cup in Japan in 2013.

On 25 May 2013, Barnes refereed the English Premiership final between Leicester Tigers and Northampton Saints (his fifth English Premiership final), during which Barnes sent off Northampton captain Dylan Hartley for calling him "a fucking cheat". This was the first time a player had been sent off in an English Premiership final. Hartley's subsequent 11-week ban at an RFU disciplinary hearing cost him his place on the British and Irish Lions tour of Australia (their first successful tour for sixteen years).

Barnes was one of 12 referees selected to officiate the 2015 Rugby World Cup.

On 22 December 2017, Barnes broke the all time Premiership appearances record (191) for a referee while officiating Worcester Warriors 23–8 victory over London Irish.

He was selected as a match official for the 2019 Rugby World Cup in Japan.

In January 2022, Barnes refereed his 250th Premiership Rugby match.

On 5 November 2022, Barnes refereed the match between Wales and New Zealand in the 2022 Autumn Nations Series. It was his 100th international match as a referee, equalling the record set by Wales' Nigel Owens.

References

External links
Rugby World Cup 2007 match official appointments set IRB.com

1979 births
Living people
Alumni of the University of East Anglia
English barristers
English rugby union referees
People educated at Monmouth School for Boys
People from Lydney
Sportspeople from Gloucestershire
Rugby World Cup referees
Six Nations Championship referees
European Rugby Champions Cup referees
EPCR Challenge Cup referees
The Rugby Championship referees
Premiership Rugby referees
People from Bream, Gloucestershire